Akim Camara is a German violinist child prodigy who began playing at the age of two.

Music career
Akim Camara was born in Berlin to a Nigerian father and a German mother. In May 2003, at two and a half years of age, Akim received violin lessons by instructor Birgit Thiele at the Marzahn-Hellersdorf School of Music. Akim's teacher began instructing the toddler twice a week in 45-minute sessions. After six months of this training regimen, Akim had his debut performance in December 2003 at the age of three in a Christmas concert "Schneeflöckchen, Weißröckchen" put on by the Marzahn-Hellersdorf School of Music.

Birgit Thiele and the music school principal, Gudrun Mueller, told André Rieu, through the celebrity Dutch violinist's website, about Akim's talent. Rieu sent a camera crew to Berlin to film Akim's playing. He then invited Akim to his studio in Maastricht, Netherlands, along with his parents and grandparents.

Within two weeks, in July 2004, Akim was performing with Rieu in concert at Kerkrade's Parkstad Limburg Stadion filled to near max capacity. After performing a "water trick,"  Akim then performed Ferdinand Kuchler's violin concertino in G, opus 11 followed by a brief encore performance.

Following the performance, Rieu took Akim under his wing, paying for his musical lessons on both violin and piano.

After an interview and appearance on a Danish TV show, Akim performed once again with André Rieu.

Akim has since performed on television with the likes of Wolfgang Fischer and Richard Clayderman.

He later became part of the orchestra Deutsche Streicherphilharmonie. There he met Martha Roske (viola), Sophia Eschenburg (violin) and Paula Eschenburg (cello), and together they formed a quartet ("Lieberman quartet"). They won a second prize at the German youth music competition Jugend musiziert, and performed concerts across Germany and in the Baltic States.

References

German people of Nigerian descent
Living people
Child classical musicians
German classical violinists
Male classical violinists
21st-century classical violinists
21st-century male musicians
Year of birth missing (living people)